The 2022–23 Espérance Sportive de Tunis season is the 104th season in existence and the club's 68th consecutive season in the top flight of Tunisian football. In addition to the domestic league, Espérance de Tunis are participating in this season's editions of the Tunisian Cup and the CAF Champions League. As the reigning domestic champions, they will contest the Tunisian Super Cup against CS Sfaxien in 2023.

Espérance de Tunis was not scheduled to play any matches between 9 November and 10 December as Mohamed Ali Ben Romdhane, Ghailene Chaalali and Yassine Meriah participated with Tunisia at 2022 FIFA World Cup in Qatar.

Squad list
Note: Flags indicate national team as has been defined under FIFA eligibility rules. Players may hold more than one non-FIFA nationality.

Staff:
 Nader Daoud (assistant coach)
 Anis Boussaïdi (assistant coach)
 Amine Ltifi (assistant coach)
 Hamdi Kasraoui (goalkeeper coach)
 Sabri Bouazizi (fitness coach)
 Aymen Mathlouthi (fitness coach)
 Yassine Ben Ahmed (doctor)
 Lassad Lamari (physiotherapist)
 Nabil Ghazouani (physiotherapist)
 Seifeddine Dziri (physiotherapist)

Transfers

In

Out

Friendlies

Competitions

Overview

{| class="wikitable" style="text-align: center"
|-
!rowspan=2|Competition
!colspan=8|Record
!rowspan=2|Starting round
!rowspan=2|Final position / round
!rowspan=2|First match
!rowspan=2|Last match
|-
!
!
!
!
!
!
!
!
|-
| Ligue 1

| First round
| 1st
| 26 October 2022
| 2023
|-
| Tunisian Cup

| Round of 32 
| Quarter-finals
| 15 February 2023
| 2023
|-
| Tunisian Super Cup

| Final
| Final
| colspan=2| 2023
|-
| CAF Champions League

| Second round
| Quarter-finals
| 9 October 2022
| 2023
|-
! Total

|bgcolor=silver colspan=2|
! 9 October 2022
! 2023

Ligue 1

First round
Group A

League table

Results by round

Matches

Playoff

League table

Results by round

Matches

Results summary

Tunisian Cup

Tunisian Super Cup

CAF Champions League

Qualifying rounds

Second round

Group stage

Group D

Knockout stage

Quarter-finals

Statistics

Playing statistics

|-

‡ Player left the club mid-season
y Youth team

Goals

Assists

Cleansheets

Disciplinary record

‡ Player left the club mid-season

Notes

References

External links

2022-23
Tunisian football clubs 2022–23 season
2022–23 CAF Champions League participants seasons